Aalborg Carnival is the name for the annual cultural event carnival in the city of Aalborg – the fourth-largest city in Denmark.

The carnival takes place the last week in May (week 21) and is the largest carnival in Scandinavia (advertised as "the biggest carnival in northern Europe"). The Aalborg Carnival stands for a week and has three main carnival events: The Grand Parade, Battle of Carnival Bands and Children’s Carnival. The carnival week is for everyone – both professional carnival groups, children and everybody who wants to act on his or her instincts and create their own costume and join the celebration of life.

A week of Carnival

The Grand Parade
The Grand Parade is a carnival event that attracts about 100,000 people to the streets of Aalborg each year. About 15 professional carnival groups from all over the world open the parade and following them are thousands of people dressed out, dancing and celebrating life. The parade begins in four different sites in Aalborg. The different parts meet up downtown Aalborg and form one parade continuing to the city park Kildeparken. Here the Carnival Party continues for the rest of the day and the people can listen to live music, dance, see carnival shows and much more.

Battle of Carnival Bands 
Earlier there was an international carnival celebration called Battle of Carnival Bands the day before the Grand Parade. Since around 2008 it has been the weekend before and name World of Carnival. Every year many carnival groups from all over the world travel to Aalborg to participate.

Children’s Carnival 
The children also have their own carnival as several thousands of children of all ages dress up and march through the streets of Aalborg with their parents. During this special day the city park, Kildeparken is transformed into a magic world filled with experiences and thrills for the children.

History 
Kirsti Thorvaldsen, Ebbe Lauridsen, Kaj Steensgård and Bramwell Flyckt are the founders of the Carnival in Aalborg. In 1983, they organised the first carnival in Aalborg and in this context established the association, Aalborg Carnival. Bramwell Flyckt was elected chairman of the ginger group. His intention was to celebrate fantasy and the coming of spring through carnival traditions: a transformation of the city into a gigantic theatre with the citizens as actors, the street as the stage and the body as a dancing sculpture. Thus, in 1983, the Carnival Association was established as a grass-root organisation, and the very first Carnival in Aalborg was held in the centre of Aalborg on May 28, 1983. The carnival parade consisted of 5-10,000 participants. 
Since 1986, the association has had a secretariat to their disposal, which acts as an employment project. The secretariat, which collaborates with the board members and volunteers coordinates all of the association's events.  
After the carnival in 1987, the association found itself in a crisis. Parts of the board did not wish to continue the work and the number of members decreased. On behalf of the general assembly, Carl Anton Christensen and Bramwell Flyckt were granted authority to develop a new model for the carnival that should rely on the assistance of NFU -'Nordjyske Fritids og Ungdomsklubber' (Youth and Leisure centers of Northern Jutland). NFU decided to offer their support and to contribute with considerable manpower to the board's work. Thus, the Carnival Association rose again.   
Initially, Carnival in Aalborg was held in the centre of Aalborg. Due to the lack of safety in the centre and a substantial decrease in revenues, the board decided to move the event to the nearby park, Kildeparken.

Traditions

Carnival Theme 
Every year, Carnival in Aalborg presents a different carnival theme, which lays down the guidelines for the carnival in question and opens up for a broad variety of costumes. The theme serves as a source of inspiration for the participants, but is not a demand - all costumes are welcome.

Themes throughout the years:
 2020: When I Grow Up...
 2019: The four seasons
 2018: By land, water and air
 2017: The world is full of...
 2016: Once upon a time...
 2015: Taboo
 2014: Trends of the time
 2013: Angels and Demons
 2012: The World Upside Down
 2011: Sexzoological Zoo
 2010: Mars and Venus.
 2009: La Dolce Vita - The sweet life.
 2008: Magic in the air.
 2007: Masquerade.
 2006: Exotic - Erotic.
 2005: The Shepherdess and the Chimney Sweep -and other Fairytales.
 2004: Atlantic.
 2003: Trends, trans & traditions.
 2002: Reflection.
 2001: Faith, Hope & Honesty.
 2000: New Horizon.
 1999: Where the Rainbow Ends.
 1998: Mother Sea.
 1997: Satire & Satyrs.
 1996: East of the Sun and West of the Moon.
 1995: Fertility and Colour.
 1994: Nordic for 1000 years.
 1993: Nordic for 1000 years.
 1992: Mask, Myth and Music.

The Carnival Poster 
Since the very start of the Aalborg Carnival, an annual carnival poster has been produced. Most years, the carnival poster has been found through a contest between both professional and amateur artists. 
Every year, the carnival poster is exhibited in any different places all over North Jutland and is seen by thousands of people during the Carnival time.

Carrus Navalis 
Every year when the sun regains its strength and the vernal equinox promises that spring is coming, the pageant Carrus Navalis moves through the streets of Aalborg keeping an ancient tradition alive. The Carrus Navalis (Car-naval) parade in Aalborg is inspired by ancient pagan traditions and serves as a proclamation of spring, fantasy and fertility - and the start of a new carnival season.

The pageant is composed of symbols and represents a part of an extensive carnival tradition that praises light’s triumph over darkness. The pageant is led by mask dancers and men with bells who chase away darkness, winter and evil spirits. Behind this first part of the pageant, the boat, Carrus Navalis, is drawn accompanied by both a captain and his sailors - all of them giving landlubbers a very hard time! Behind the boat a ploughman and a pair of yoke prepare the earth for sowing and the sowing man lays the seed so that new life can begin to grow. Nothing grows without the sun, and the sun is paid tribute to through an accurate copy of the Chariot of the Sun, which is carried as part of the pageant. Ending the pageant, cannons are targeting the coming of spring accompanied by music, samba rhythms, dancing and joy.

References

External links 

 Official website Aalborg Carnival

Parades in Europe
Carnivals in Denmark
Tourist attractions in Aalborg
Spring (season) events in Denmark